The Alcoa Building (a.k.a. the Regional Enterprise Tower) is a  skyscraper in downtown Pittsburgh, Pennsylvania.  It was completed in 1953 and has 31 floors. It is the 15th tallest building in the city and is adjacent to Mellon Square. A unique radiant heating and cooling system is contained in the ceiling: since there are no pipes, radiators, or air conditioning units along the exterior walls, an additional  of rentable space was gained. Also, the windows rotate 360 degrees so they can be washed from the inside.

Originally the headquarters for the Aluminum Company of America (ALCOA), the unique aluminum walls of the building are 1/8 inch thick, which gives the building a very light weight and economical design.  It was the first skyscraper with an all-aluminum facade.  Upon ALCOA's 2001 relocation to a new headquarters building on Pittsburgh's North Shore near PNC Park, the old ALCOA Building became a home to government entities, regional nonprofits and small start-up companies including the RIDC.

Nixon Theater 
From December 7, 1903, until April 29, 1950, the site of the Regional Enterprise Tower was home to the original incarnation of the Nixon Theater built by Samuel F. Nixon-Nirdlinger and Senator George T. Oliver.  On opening night it was described as the "world's most perfect playhouse".  An ornate Beaux Arts structure, crowned by a large dome it was arguably the most opulent theater in city history.  S. Trevor Hadly in Only in Pittsburgh describes that the interior "was in the Louis XVth style.  Inside were massive imitation Parawazza marble columns capped with solid gold. ... The side walls were paneled to look like damask silk ... framed in a molding and styling of green, gold, and red. Velvet and silk draperies added profusely to the décor."  Productions such as the 1905 staging of Ben Hur used four horse-drawn chariots while Garden of Allah "called for a herd of camels, horses, and goats and 50 camel drivers."  The sale of the site to Alcoa in 1950 was met with protests, with actress Katharine Hepburn writing to the city before demolition: "I'm infuriated, The new skyscraper will be just another building -- maybe fascinating, but not glamorous."

A second smaller and less glamorous incarnation carried the Nixon Theater name at 956 Liberty Avenue until 1976.  That playhouse had opened in 1914 and previously operated under the names "The Victoria", "The Shubert" and "The Senator" but was renamed and refurbished by September 1950.  During the 1950s and early 1960s it sponsored family fare but by the 1970s it featured adult entertainment and closed in 1976.

The Residences at The Historic Alcoa Building 
On July 14, 2015, PMC Property Group closed on a $40 million loan to redevelop what they continue to call the Alcoa Building, including building 241 class-A multi-family units, 133,000 square feet of office space, and 6,200 square feet of retail including restaurants.  The apartments began renting in March 2016.

See also 
 List of tallest buildings in Pittsburgh

References

External links

 Post-Gazette photo and description of the Old Nixon Theater
 Emporis

Skyscraper office buildings in Pittsburgh
Office buildings completed in 1953
Headquarters in the United States
Pittsburgh History & Landmarks Foundation Historic Landmarks
Alcoa
Harrison & Abramovitz buildings
Residential skyscrapers in Pittsburgh
1953 establishments in Pennsylvania